The 15th Bombardment Training Wing is a disbanded United States Air Force unit. Its last assignment was with Second Air Force, at Colorado Springs Army Air Base, Colorado, where it was inactivated on 9 April 1946.

History
The wing was activated at March Field, California in December 1940 and assigned to the Southwest Air District.  Its operational components were the 47th and 48th Bombardment Groups  In September 1941, the wing was inactivated and its personnel used to form the 4th Air Support Command.

It trained groups and heavy bombardment replacement crews for Second Air Force June 1942 until February 1945 when it ceased all activity.

Lineage
 Constituted as the 15th Bombardment Wing on 19 October 1940
 Activated on 18 December 1940
 Inactivated on 3 September 1941
 Activated on 23 June 1942
 Redesignated 15th Bombardment Training Wing in January 1943
 Redesignated 15th Bombardment Operational Training Wing in April 1943
 Inactivated on 9 April 1946
 Disbanded on 8 October 1948

Assignments
 Southwest Air District, 18 December 1940 – 3 September 1941
 Second Air Force, 23 June 1942 – 6 April 1946

Components
 47th Bombardment Group: 14 August-1 September 1941
 48th Bombardment Group: 15 January-1 September 1941
 Numerous groups assigned for training, 1942–1946

Stations
 March Field, California, 18 December 1940
 Fresno Army Air Base, California, c. 2 August – 3 September 1941
 Gowen Field, Idaho, 23 June 1942
 Sioux City Army Air Base, Iowa, November 1942
 Gowen Field, Idaho, July 1943
 Pueblo Army Air Base, Colorado, May 1944
 Peterson Field, Colorado, 8 September 1944 – 9 April 1946

References

Notes

Bibliography

  
 

015
Military units and formations disestablished in 1948